Adam McMullen (June 12, 1872 – March 2, 1959) was an American Republican politician and was the 21st Governor of Nebraska.

McMullen was born in Wellsville, New York and as a young boy moved with his family to Wymore, Nebraska. He was a founding member of the Beta Tau chapter of Delta Tau Delta fraternity at the University of Nebraska-Lincoln in 1894. He graduated from the University of Nebraska in 1896, and matriculated at George Washington University, where he earned a law degree in 1899. He was married to Cora Greenwood.

Career
Still in Washington, D. C. after his graduation in 1899, McMullen worked as a secretary for Nebraska Congressman Jesse Strode, then for Senator Charles Henry Dietrich. He returned to Wymore, Nebraska where he passed the state bar and entered into private practice. 

In 1904, McMullen was elected to the Nebraska House of Representatives; He was reelected to a second term in 1906. After this time, McMullen served as mayor of Wymore.

In 1916, McMullen was elected to the Nebraska State Senate and served from 1917 to 1919. From 1916 to 1920, he was also a member of the Wymore School Board, serving as president during the last two years. He was elected Governor of Nebraska in 1924 and in 1926. During his tenure, the state deficit was erased by implementing a special tax, and the state highway program was improved.

After stepping down from governorship, McMullen settled in Beatrice, Nebraska and continued to stay politically active while pursuing his own business interests. He served as Postmaster of Beatrice in 1932. He was also a  delegate to 1944 Republican National Convention and the chairman of the National Governors Association in 1927 to 1928.

Death
McMullen died on March 2, 1959. He is interred at Wymore Cemetery in Wymore, Nebraska.

References

External links
 
 National Governors Association
 Encyclopedia of Nebraska

|-

|-

1872 births
1959 deaths
George Washington University Law School alumni
Republican Party governors of Nebraska
Republican Party members of the Nebraska House of Representatives
Nebraska lawyers
Republican Party Nebraska state senators
People from Gage County, Nebraska
People from Wellsville, New York
University of Nebraska–Lincoln alumni